South Carolina Highway 24 (SC 24) is a  state highway in the U.S. state of South Carolina. The highway connects Westminster and Anderson.

Route description
SC 24 begins at an intersection with U.S. Route 76 (US 76) and US 123 (East Main Street) in Westminster, within Oconee County, where the roadway continues as Oak Street. It travels to the southwest and immediately curves to the southeast before leaving the city limits. The highway passes by Pleasant Hill Cemetery and travels through rural areas of the county. Then, it has an intersection with SC 11. The highway continues traveling through rural areas of the county and has an intersection with SC 182 in Oakway. During a short east-northeast section, there is a very brief concurrency with SC 59. The highway passes by Hays Cemetery. SC 24 enters Anderson County and almost immediately has an interchange with Interstate 85 (I-85) which includes an intersection with SC 243 at its northern terminus. It crosses over part of Lake Hartwell on an unnamed bridge. A short distance later, it begins a concurrency with SC 187 at the Portman Shoals Intersection. The two highways cross over another part of the lake on the Calvin Wesley Belcher Bridge. It then enters West Gate, where SC 187 leaves the concurrency. SC 24 travels along the southern city limits of Centerville and passes just north of Anderson Regional Airport. In West Anderson, the highway passes Lakeside Middle School and intersects SC 28. About  later, it enters the city limits of Anderson. Just under  later, it meets its eastern terminus, an intersection with US 29 Business (US 29 Bus.)/US 76/US 178/SC 28 Bus./SC 81 (Murray Avenue).

History
The first SC 24 was an original state highway, which operated as a spur from SC 12 in Hibernia, to Ninety Six. By 1926, SC 24 was extended southeast on new primary routing through Pelion to SC 6 in North. In 1928, SC 24 was extended south, from North, to SC 64 in Olar. In 1929, SC 24 was extended west, in concurrency with US 25 to Hodges, then replacing SC 25 to Donalds, and SC 15 to SC 2 in Clemson. That same year, SC 24 was rerouted to avoid Ninety Six, with its former route becoming SC 246. By 1930, SC 24 was rerouted at North, replacing SC 6 to Orangeburg then in concurrency with SC 2, through Bowman and Rosinville, to US 78. In 1933, US 178 replaced SC 24 between Anderson and US 78; SC 24 remained west of Anderson to Georgia. In 1938, SC 24 was renumbered as part of SC 28.

The second and current SC 24 was established in 1938 as a renumbering of SC 18, between Westminster and Anderson.  By 1964, SC 24 eastern terminus changed from Market and Main Streets to Whitier and Main Streets, coinciding with the elimination of SC 80.

Major intersections

See also

References

External links

 
 Mapmikey's South Carolina Highways Page: SC 24

024
Transportation in Oconee County, South Carolina
Transportation in Anderson County, South Carolina